The Battle of Friedberg was fought on 24 August 1796 between a First French Republic army led by Jean Victor Marie Moreau and a Habsburg Austrian army led by Maximilian Anton Karl, Count Baillet de Latour. The French army, which was advancing eastward on the south side of the Danube, managed to catch an isolated Austrian infantry regiment. In the ensuing combat, the Austrians were cut to pieces. Friedberg is a Bavarian town located on the Lech River near Augsburg. The action was fought during the War of the First Coalition.

Two French armies crossed the Rhine and thrust east into Germany in the Rhine Campaign of 1796. Jean-Baptiste Jourdan's Army of Sambre-et-Meuse advanced on a more northerly route while Moreau's Army of Rhin-et-Moselle took a more southerly path. Opposing them were Wilhelm von Wartensleben's Army of the Lower Rhine and Latour's Army of the Upper Rhine, both under the overall direction of Archduke Charles, Duke of Teschen. Moreau defeated Charles at the battles of Ettlingen on 9 July and Neresheim on 11 August.

As the outnumbered Austrians retreated, Charles looked for a chance to throw a superior force against one of the French armies. That opportunity came in late August when a cavalry brigadier Friedrich Joseph, Count of Nauendorf reported an opening. Leaving Latour's army severely weakened, the archduke rapidly marched north with 27,000 troops to join with Wartensleben in defeating Jourdan at the Battle of Amberg on 24 August. Unaware of Charles' maneuver, Moreau forged ahead and smashed the isolated Schröder Infantry Regiment Nr. 7 at Friedberg. Unfortunately for Moreau, Jourdan's drubbing at Amberg and a second defeat at Würzburg ruined the French offensive. By the beginning of September, the increasingly isolated Moreau was compelled to retrace his steps toward France.

References

Battles involving France
Battles involving Austria
Battles of the French Revolutionary Wars
Battles of the War of the First Coalition
Conflicts in 1796
1796 in the Holy Roman Empire
Battles in Bavaria
Battles inscribed on the Arc de Triomphe